Violet Amy Gillett  (1898 – 1996) was a Canadian painter, craftsperson, watercolorists, sculptor, illustrator, author and educator known for her encouragement of the arts in the New Brunswick province.

Early life
Violet Gillett was born in Liverpool, England in 1898. In 1908 she emigrated with her family to Andover, New Brunswick.

She attended the Ontario College of Art in Toronto and in 1928 she attended the Royal College of Art in London, England.

She later did a private study under J. E. H. MacDonald, Arthur Lismer and Fred Varley.

Career
While still a student at the Ontario College of Art, Gillett received a commission to produce medical illustrations for Medical Department of the University of Toronto.  These illustrations were used to identify the heart diseases in the First World War Veterans. Due to lack of color photography, these illustrations were considered very helpful. She also created illustrations for Dr. Frederick Banting and Dr. Charles Best, the co-discoverers of insulin.

After graduating from the Royal College of Art, Gillett returned to New Brunswick and took up the position of Principal of the Department of Fine and Applied Art at the Saint John Vocational School. She accomplished being a part of a pivotal role in New Brunswick's art education and in 1939 New Brunswick province adopted her curriculum for creative art in elementary schools.

During her tenure at Saint John Vocational School Gillett was active in the creation of Maritime Art magazine. This publication was the first Canadian magazine with a sole focus on the visual arts. The first issue was published in 1940 under the auspices of the Maritime Art Association. Gillett and student volunteers from the Vocational School were responsible for production of the first issues.

Gillett participated in the formation of the Maritime Art Association. She was the secretary for nine years then succeeded Walter Abell as president in 1946.

Gillet retired from Saint John Vocational School in 1947. She went on to open a shop with her sister Beatrice, paint murals for the local church, and write and illustrate two books; Where the Wild Flowers Grow and In the Fields and Wood. The church murals on the southeast wall illustrated the children hymns and the those on the northeast wall illustrated “All things bright and beautiful” and the rest of the two walls contained the New Testament scenes set in local New Brunswick landscape. She continued to produce artwork in different mediums like fabrics, ceramics, enamels until her lost eyesight forced her to retire.

Style and works

Artistic development

Growing up between 1900 and 1910, Violet Gillett was influenced by the era's creative culture. She was Maritimes Renaissance and national artist known for her amazingly detailed watercolors of flowers and sculptures. The process of approaching her artworks shows that she seeks inspiration from her past life and experiences. Gillett's multiple technical skills imparted her teaching to her students. Her strong talent for observation helped her create flawless drawings that perfectly reflected the people, life, and culture around her. “My aims – what they are – are not perhaps high. I do not think of my art works – as it seems is the fashion nowadays – as having a socially significant message – unless [it is] in trying to tell in my work, of beauty I have felt or observed, and so to bring it to the attention of others, [so it] does good to mankind and has some social value. If what I have said in my art, or have fostered in my teaching, carries into the world a sense of greater happiness and beauty in my day, then all my aims will be gratified” - Violet Gillett.

Major works

Freedom from Want, June 1944

This sculpture is a painted plaster that was produced in response to the challenge inspired by Franklin Delano Roosevelt speech. The speech was focused on the second World War freedoms. Her inspiration and rationale behind this piece was to include both food and love through mother and the child, symbolizing differing freedoms from want. This piece is part of the New Brunswick Museum Collection.

“Where the Wild Flowers Grow,” 1966 and “In the Fields and Woods,” 1967

She wrote both of these children books which contained her artwork.

Winter Night, Old Methodist Church, Andover, N.B.

This is a linocut artwork on paper in white and blue paint. It was included in Maritime Art: A Canadian Art Magazine in December–January 1942 – 1943.
 
Exhibitions

Her work has been exhibited at London’s Victoria and Albert Museum as well as at the London Color Society.

Memoir

Violet A. Gillett, Painting With Words by JoAnne Rivers. JoAnne Rivers collaborated with all the descendants of Violet Gillett and penned down her life story in this book. This book contains a glorious impression of Violet Gillett for anyone who wants to learn about her. Her great esteem in becoming the Member of the Order of Canada in 1976, reflects her hard work and achievements over the course of her life. Her commitment to her career reshaped the artwork in New Brunswick.

Death
Gillett died in 1996 in Perth-Andover, New Brunswick. She lost her eyesight over the years but she still continued to create her artworks.

Honors
Member of the Order of Canada, 1976
New Brunswick Teacher's Centennial Award (1976)
Queen's Jubilee Medal (1977)
Governor General's Medal (1977)

Bibliography

References

 New Brunswick Museum. NBM-MNB. October 7, 2022.
 A new matrix of the arts: a history of the professionalization of Canadian women artists, 1880-1914. PhD diss., Carleton University, 2008.
 Violet Amy Gillett - Bio, Artworks, Exhibitions and More. Artland. Accessed October 7, 2022.
 Rare Original Ranch Scene Watercolor by Noted Canadian Artist Violet Amy Gillett. Worthpoint. Accessed October 7, 2022.<
 Rethinking professionalism: Women and art in Canada, 1850-1970. Vol. 8. McGill-Queen's Press-MQUP, 2012.
 Regional Agency: Maritime Art Association Programming from 1935 to 1945. March 30, 2012.

1898 births
1996 deaths
20th-century Canadian women artists
20th-century Canadian painters
Canadian women painters
Canadian expatriates in England
Artists from New Brunswick
British emigrants to Canada
Artists from Liverpool
People from Perth-Andover
Members of the Order of Canada